George Stanley Mbwando (born 20 October 1975) is a Zimbabwean former professional footballer who played as a defender.

Career
In the 2003–04 season, Mbwando reached the DFB-Pokal final with Alemannia Aachen. He was sent off for a tackle in the 75th minute with opponents Werder Bremen leading 2–1. Werder Bremen went on to win 3–2.

He was a member of the Zimbabwean 2004 African Cup of Nations team, which finished bottom of their group in the first round of competition, thus failing to secure qualification for the quarter-finals. He also participated at the 2006 Africa Cup of Nations, with the same outcome.

Honours
Alemannia Aachen
 DFB-Pokal: runner-up 2003–04

References

External links
 

1975 births
Living people
Association football defenders
Zimbabwean footballers
Zimbabwe international footballers
2004 African Cup of Nations players
2006 Africa Cup of Nations players
Motor Action F.C. players
Lech Poznań players
Bonner SC players
VfB Oldenburg players
VfB Lübeck players
Alemannia Aachen players
SSV Jahn Regensburg players
FC Ingolstadt 04 players
2. Bundesliga players
Zimbabwean expatriate footballers
Expatriate footballers in Poland
Expatriate footballers in Germany
Zimbabwean expatriate sportspeople in Poland
Zimbabwean expatriate sportspeople in Germany